Fiona Watson (1968 – 19 August 2003) was a Scottish political affairs officer working in Sérgio Vieira de Mello's office who was killed along with other members of United Nations Assistance Mission in Iraq staff in the Canal Hotel bombing in Baghdad, on the afternoon of 19 August 2003.

Biography
Watson received a first class honours degree from Heriot-Watt University in Edinburgh, and an M.Phil. in 'International relations and Ballistic studies' from the University of Cambridge, where she was part of Darwin College.

Prior to joining the UN, Watson worked with the European Commission and for a period with the Organization for Security and Co-operation in Europe. During her career with the UN, Watson had been involved in many of the world's hot spots, including Bosnia and Kosovo: Watson worked in the United Nations Interim Administration Mission in Kosovo to Bernard Kouchner the UN's special representative to Kosovo.  An experienced linguist, she worked with the UN for almost four years as a political analyst. At the time of her death she was political affairs officer on the staff of Special Representative of the Secretary-General Sérgio Vieira de Mello.

Watson's family and friends set up the Fiona Watson Memorial Fund to provide bursaries for final year students at her first university, Heriot-Watt, to enable them to spend a year with the UN or a similar international organisation.

See also
Attacks on humanitarian workers

References
 Fiona Watson
 Darwin college alumni organisation
 Darwin college tribute
 The Fiona Watson Memorial Fund

1968 births
2003 deaths
People educated at St Leonards School
Scottish philanthropists
Alumni of Heriot-Watt University
Alumni of Darwin College, Cambridge
British officials of the United Nations
Scottish terrorism victims
People killed in the Canal Hotel bombing
British people murdered abroad
20th-century British philanthropists
2003 murders in Iraq